David Paisley (born 2 February 1979) is a Scottish actor, domestic violence and LGBTQIA+ rights campaigner, known for roles as midwife Ben Saunders in Holby City, Ryan Taylor in Tinsel Town and Rory Murdoch in River City. Some of his characters have been controversial due to their sexual orientation.

Early life
Paisley is the son of author Janet Paisley, and is one of seven children. He was voted 'Britain's sexiest man' by readers of Gay Times magazine in 2003. He grew up in Glen Village near Falkirk. At 15 years of age, Paisley went to an LGBT group where he eventually met his first partner. At 17, he attended the University of Glasgow to study physics, during which time he appeared in a community workshop (part of 7:84 theatre company in Glasgow) and then studied Optometry at Glasgow Caledonian University. At 18, he came out to his family who were supportive and helped in his efforts campaigning against the Keep the Clause campaign.

Career
Paisley began acting as a teenage boy when he heard about an open audition for television drama Tinsel Town, a 1999-2000 television drama (co-produced by BBC Scotland and Raindog/Deep Indigo Productions). He went on to play one of the main characters, Ryan Taylor, the 17-year-old partner of a police officer.

Later, Paisley appeared in a few stage productions. Then in 2002, he landed the part of midwife Ben Saunders in BBC1's popular medical soap Holby City. Ben's kiss with his on-screen same-sex partner attracted 114 complaints from viewers.

In 2008, Paisley starred in the short film Sweat, which was screened at the London Lesbian and Gay Film Festival, and selected for screening at NewFest in New York, June 2008.

Paisley completed filming on his regular role as Rory Murdoch on BBC Scotland's River City, the son of gangster Lenny Murdoch and departed the show in 2009.

Paisley starred as 'Madam' Gary in the play The Backroom by Adrian Pagan at The Cock Tavern Theatre in Kilburn, London in March–May 2009, where he provided a 'particularly credible' performance as his 'nervy and paranoid' character.

In May 2009, he also starred as Michael in the successful stage production of Muhmah at the HighTide Festival. In 2009–10, he took to the stage again in the UK Tour of Over The Rainbow: The Eva Cassidy Story, in which he played the part of Dan Cassidy.

In 2010, he made his directorial debut with the play The Lasses, O (written by his mother Janet Paisley). at the Edinburgh Festival. He also starred as Rick in the 2010 horror film Unhappy Birthday.

In 2013, Paisley "starred" in a short film produced for the Dutch Film Festival called Fall-out, described as a post-apocalyptic romantic comedy.

In 2016, he played the role of Saki in Katherine Rundell's Life According to Saki at the Edinburgh Festival Fringe; the play went on to win the Carol Tambor Best of Edinburgh Award and subsequently toured Off-off-Broadway.

In November 2019, he returned to River City as Rory Murdoch, back from the dead having faked his own suicide.

Filmography

Awards and nominations

|-
! scope="row" | 2016
| Carol Tambor Best of Edinburgh Award
| Best of Edinburgh
| Life According to Saki
| 
|

Personal life 
Paisley is a vegetarian. He was voted 'Britain's sexiest man' by readers of Gay Times magazine in 2003. In 2021, SNP MP Joanna Cherry alleged he had defamed her on Twitter, though he denied this and Cherry did not take the matter to court.

In March 2021 Paisley was nominated for '"Awesome" Ally of the Year' by Diva magazine. In May 2021 Paisley was nominated for '"Celebrity" of the Year' at the National Diversity Awards. In June 2021 he was announced as a winner of the Attitude Pride Awards 2021. In August 2021 he was shortlisted for the "Community Champion Award" at the Proud Scotland Awards.

Paisley declared in August 2021 that he would move from Scotland as he "no longer feels safe".

References

External links
 

1979 births
Alumni of the University of Glasgow
Living people
Scottish male film actors
Scottish male television actors
Scottish male soap opera actors
Scottish gay actors
Scottish LGBT entertainers
Alumni of Glasgow Caledonian University